CFPW-FM is a Canadian radio station broadcasting at 95.7 FM in Powell River, British Columbia with an classic hits format branded as 95.7 Coast FM. The station is owned by Vista Broadcast Group.

History
The station began broadcasting in 1967 at 1280 AM with the call sign CHQB. The station was originally owned by Sunshine Coast Broadcasting ltd and was later acquired by Vista Broadcast Group in 2005. On May 18, 2007 the station received approval from the CRTC to convert to 94.1 FM, but the application was denied. On November 1, 2007, the station was given approval to use the frequency 95.7 FM.

The station relaunched as an FM station on August 27, 2008.

References

External links
95.7 Coast FM

Fpw
Powell River, British Columbia
Radio stations established in 1967
Fpw
Fpw
1967 establishments in British Columbia